T. J. Middleton (born May 2, 1968) is a former professional tennis player from the United States.  Middleton attended the University of Georgia where he helped lead the Bulldogs to the 1987 National Championship.  He was the 1990 SEC Doubles Champion.  He is a member of the Delta chapter of the Sigma Chi fraternity.  He turned professional in 1990 and had a career that spanned 10 years before his retirement at the end of 2000. A doubles specialist, he achieved a career high singles ranking of world No. 221 and his highest doubles ranking was world No. 63.

Doubles
Middleton did not win any senior doubles titles but reached the final on four separate occasions, at Casablanca in 1992, Long Island (1997), Marseille (1998) and Boston (1999).  In 1994 he reached the Wimbledon Mixed Doubles final.

Post-professional tennis
Middleton was invited to play at the 2008 Wimbledon Championships in the Gentlemen's Invitational Doubles, playing with David Wheaton in the round-robin group. He had won the tournament in 2004 with the same partner and finished runners up in 2005 and 2006.

Career finals

Doubles (3 losses)

External links
 
 
 

1968 births
Living people
American male tennis players
Georgia Bulldogs tennis players
Tennis players from Atlanta
Sportspeople from Auburn, New York
Tennis people from Georgia (U.S. state)
Tennis people from New York (state)